Paul Hastings LLP is a global law firm that represents a client base in finance, M&A, private equity, and litigation. 

The firm specializes in white collar and government disputes, energy, infrastructure, and intellectual property. Paul Hastings has been ranked on The American Lawyer’s A-List for eleven consecutive years, in 2020, was named Transatlantic Firm of the Year at the British Legal Award, and in 2021, Most Impressive Investigations Practice of the Year at the Global Investigations Review Awards. Paul Hastings is widely known as one of the foremost anti-union law firms in the United States, regularly representing employers in organized labor-related litigation and combating union organizing campaigns.

History

Paul Hastings was founded in Los Angeles in 1951 by Lee Paul, Robert Hastings, and Leonard Janofsky. Over the years, Paul Hastings expanded its size and geographic reach to meet client needs. Today the firm’s Wall Street client base has made New York its largest office.  The firm maintains a strong presence in key financial and business capitals around the globe, including in California and throughout Asia, Europe, Latin America and elsewhere in the United States.    

As of October 2022, the chairman of the firm is Frank Lopez.  Over the last two decades, Paul Hastings has been a market leader in financial growth having more than tripled its profits per partner to become one of the largest and strongest law firms in the world. Over this period, the firm has had the largest profit per partner growth in the highest-grossing half of the Am Law 100.

 Firm revenue (2021):  $1.31 billion
 Profit Per Partner (2021): $3.9 million 
 Revenue Per Lawyer (2021): $1.3 million 
 Geographic Scope: 21 Offices 
 Attorneys: ~1,000 
In October 2021, the firm announced that Mr. Zachary will step down as Chair in October 2022. Frank Lopez, co-head of the firm’s securities and capital markets practice and partner in the firm’s leveraged finance practice in New York, was voted chair-elect effective October 2021. Washington, D.C.-based Sherrese Smith, vice chair of the firm’s data privacy and cybersecurity practice and partner in the firm’s media, technology and telecommunications practice, was elected managing partner.

Rankings
The firm is one of only a handful of law firms ranked across core finance areas: structured credit, leveraged finance, private credit, capital markets and real estate finance.

Notable current or former attorneys 
 Ronald Barak (born 1943), Olympic gymnast.
 Ralph B. Everett, first African-American partner at Paul Hastings and adviser to several U.S. presidential campaigns.
 Jay C. Gandhi, first South Asian American federal judge in California, was a partner at the firm.
 Robert Luskin, specialist in white-collar crime and federal and state government investigations, and an adjunct professor of law at Georgetown University Law Center, where he teaches a course in global anti-corruption.
 Thomas P. O'Brien, former U.S. Attorney for the Central District of California, joined Paul Hastings in 2009.
 Robert P. Silvers, U.S. Under Secretary for Strategy, Policy, and Plans.

See also
List of largest law firms by profits per partner

References

 
Law firms established in 1951
Law firms based in Los Angeles
Foreign law firms with offices in Hong Kong
Foreign law firms with offices in Japan
1951 establishments in California